Harry Goodwin was a British photographer.

Harry Goodwin may also refer to:

Harry Goodwin (cricketer) (1870–1955), cricketer for Gloucestershire
Harry Goodwin, candidate in Leek
Harry Goodwin (footballer) (1903–1989), Scottish footballer

See also
Henry Goodwin (disambiguation)
Harold Goodwin (disambiguation)
Harry Godwin (1901–1985), English botanist and ecologist